Aubiac is the name of the following communes in France:

 Aubiac, Gironde, in the Gironde department
 Aubiac, Lot-et-Garonne, in the Lot-et-Garonne department